Ralph Shackman (29 March 1910 - June 1981), was the first professor of urology at the Hammersmith Hospital, who did significant research in kidney failure, hemodialysis, and kidney transplantation. With Jim Dempster, in 1960, he performed one of Britain's first human kidney transplantations.

References

British urologists
British transplant surgeons
1910 births
1989 deaths
20th-century surgeons